Cork Borough was a parliamentary constituency represented in Dáil Éireann, the lower house of the Irish parliament or Oireachtas from 1921 to 1969, and as Cork City from 1977 to 1981. The method of election was proportional representation by means of the single transferable vote (PR-STV).

TDs

History and boundaries
The constituency was created by the Government of Ireland Act 1920 as a 4-seat constituency for the Southern Ireland House of Commons from the Cork City constituency in which Cork had been represented in the United Kingdom House of Commons at Westminster since 1801. The constituency would have continued as a single-seat constituency at Westminster.

At the 1921 election for the Southern Ireland House of Commons, the four seats were won uncontested by Sinn Féin, who treated it as part of the election to the Second Dáil. It was never used as a Westminster constituency; under s. 1(4) of the Irish Free State (Agreement) Act 1922, no writ was to be issued "for a constituency in Ireland other than a constituency in Northern Ireland". Therefore, no vote was held in Cork at the 1922 United Kingdom general election on 15 November 1922, shortly before the Irish Free State left the United Kingdom on 6 December 1922.

Under the Electoral Act 1923, it became a 5-seat constituency and was first used at the 1923 general election. Its representation fluctuated between 4 and 5 seats until its abolition for the 1969 general election. The constituency was recreated under the Electoral (Amendment) Act 1974 as Cork City. It was only used for the 1977 general election and a by-election in 1979.

It was abolished under the Electoral (Amendment) Act 1980 and replaced at the 1981 general election by Cork North-Central and Cork South-Central.

Elections

1979 by-election 
Following the death of Labour Party TD Patrick Kerrigan, a by-election was held on 7 November 1979. The seat was won by the Fine Gael candidate Liam Burke.

1977 general election

1967 by-election 
Following the death of Labour Party TD Seán Casey, a by-election was held on 9 November 1967. The seat was won by the Fianna Fáil candidate Seán French.

1965 general election

1964 by-election 
Following the death of Fianna Fáil TD John Galvin, a by-election was held on 19 February 1964. The seat was won by the Fianna Fáil candidate Sheila Galvin, widow of the deceased TD.

The surplus votes of the elected candidate were distributed after being declared elected because there was a possibility another candidate could have reached the threshold of a third of a quota which would have meant their election deposit was returned to them.

1961 general election

1957 general election

1956 by-election 
Following the death of Fianna Fáil TD Patrick McGrath, a by-election was held on 2 August 1956. The seat was won by Fianna Fáil candidate John Galvin.

1954 general election

1954 by-election 
Following the death of Fine Gael TD Thomas F. O'Higgins, a by-election was held on 3 March 1954. The seat was won by the Fine Gael candidate Stephen Barrett.

1951 general election

1948 general election

1946 by-election 
Following the resignation of Independent TD William Dwyer, a by-election was held on 14 June 1946. The seat was won by the Fianna Fáil candidate Patrick McGrath.

The surplus votes of the elected candidate were distributed after being declared elected because there was a possibility another candidate could have reached the threshold of a third of a quota which would have meant their election deposit was returned to them.

1944 general election

1943 general election 
Information on the number of transfers received by Richard Anthony on the fifth and sixth counts is unavailable so his number of votes on the fifth count is unknown.

1938 general election

1937 general election

1933 general election

1932 general election

September 1927 general election

June 1927 general election

1924 by-election 
Following the resignation of Cumann na nGaedheal TD Alfred O'Rahilly, a by-election was held on 19 November 1924. The seat was won by the Cumann na nGaedheal candidate Michael Egan.

1923 general election 

The Business and Professional Group candidates were members of the Cork Progressive Association.

1922 general election

1921 general election 

|}

See also 
Politics of the Republic of Ireland
Historic Dáil constituencies
Elections in the Republic of Ireland

References

External links 
Oireachtas Members Database

Dáil constituencies in the Republic of Ireland (historic)
Historic constituencies in County Cork
Politics of Cork (city)
1921 establishments in Ireland
1969 disestablishments in Ireland
Constituencies established in 1921
Constituencies disestablished in 1969